Choeromorpha brunneomaculata is a species of beetle in the family Cerambycidae. It was described by Stephan von Breuning in 1935. It is an extant species and it has a non-marine habitat.

References

Choeromorpha
Beetles described in 1935